The Château de Monbazillac is a château in Monbazillac, Dordogne, Nouvelle-Aquitaine, France.

External links
 Château de Monbazillac - official site

Châteaux in Dordogne
Historic house museums in Nouvelle-Aquitaine
Museums in Dordogne
Monuments historiques of Dordogne